= Local Progressive Party =

Local Progressive Party พรรคท้องถิ่นก้าวหน้า
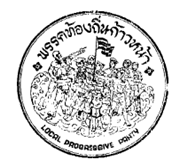
- Founded: 15 March 1971
- Dissolved: 17 November 1971
- Headquarters: Thailand
- Ideology: Localism
- Political position: Centre-left

Local Progressive Party (Thai: พรรคท้องถิ่นก้าวหน้า) is a Thai political party founded on 15 March 1971 by Chumnan Yuvaboon is leader and Ram Bunyaprasob is secretary-general. Main policy of party is build local government unit to strong.

== Party leadership ==
	Name	From	To
1	Chumnan Yuvaboon	1971	1972
2	Suradit Horasud	1992	1993
